Pagrati B.C. (alternate spellings: Pagkrati, Pagratiou, Pagkratiou, Pangrati, Pangratiou, Pangkrati, Pangkratiou) is a Greek professional basketball club. The club is located in the Pangrati neighborhood of Athens, Greece. The team competes in the Greek 2nd Division.

History
The A.O. Pagrati Athens parent sports athletic association was founded in 1929. The sport club's basketball department, Pagrati B.C., was founded in 1938. Around the era of 1950, was the basketball club's first peak period, which established it as one of the big Greek clubs of that era. In 1979, the team was in a downward spiral, as it was downgraded to the Greek 3rd Division.

In 1988, the club returned to the top-tier level Greek League, and it stayed in the top Greek Division for the next 6 years. After that 6-year run in the Greek top-tier level (A1), the club again struggled in the lower Greek divisions, until it was promoted up to the Greek 2nd Division, for the 2006–07 season.

Arena
Pagrati B.C. plays its home games at the METS Indoor Hall, which is located in the Pangrati neighborhood of Athens. The arena features two basketball courts, as well as volleyball and handball courts. The arena is used by all of Pagrati's major athletic departments. 

The volleyball teams of Panathinaikos VC Men and Panathinaikos VC Women, have also used the venue to host home games. The arena has also been used to judo matches. For basketball games, the arena has a seating capacity of 1,500 people.

Season by season

Notable players

Greece:
  Tasos Antonakis
  Efthimis Bakatsias
  Ioannis Chatzinikolas
  Ioannis Dimakos
  Stavros Elliniadis
  Georgios Gasparis
  Giannis Giannopoulos
  Panagiotis Kafkis
  Dinos Kalampakos
  Panagiotis Karatzas
  Ioannis Karamalegkos
  Antonis Lanthimos
  Yorgos Lanthimos
  Nikos Liakopoulos
  Takis Maglos
  Nikos Michalos
  Filippos Moschovitis
  Spyros Motsenigos
  Stathis Papadionysiou
 - Nick Paulos
  Andreas Petropoulos
  Ioannis Rodostoglou
  Michalis Romanidis
  Vangelis Sakellariou
  Alexandros Sigkounas
  Vangelis Sklavos
  Aris Tatarounis
  Sakis Tzalalis
  Fotis Vasilopoulos
  Dimitris Lolas

Europe:
 - Bryan Bracey
  Slaviša Koprivica

USA:
  Earl Harrison
  John Hudson
  Thomas Jordan
  Richard Rellford
  Wayne Tinkle

Rest of Americas:
  Ian Lockhart

Head coaches
  Mimis Stefanidis
  Aris Raftopoulos 
  Johnny Neumann
  Makis Dendrinos
 - Steve Giatzoglou
  Rajko Toroman
  Apostolos Kontos
  Aris Lykogiannis
  Vassilis Fragkias
  Dimitris Papadopoulos
  Dinos Kalampakos
  Dimitris Liogas 
  Giannis  Giannopoulos

Notes

References

External links
Official Team Website 
Eurobasket.com Team Profile

Pagrati B.C.
1938 establishments in Greece
Basketball teams established in 1938
Basketball teams in Greece